Familial osteodysplasia, Anderson type is a rare genetic disorder which is characterized by cranio-facial dysmorphisms and multiple skeletal anomalies. Hyperuricemia, hypertension and high erythrocyte sedimentation rates have also been reported. Approximately 6 cases have been reported in medical literature. This disorder is thought to be inherited in an autosomal recessive manner.

Description 

People with this disorder often show the following symptoms:

Craniofacial 

Underdevelopment of midface
Flat, broad nasal bridge
Thin, prognathic mandible
Pointy chin
Malocclusion
Underdeveloped teeth

Skeletal 

Scoliosis
Thinning of the calvaria
Pointy spinous processes
Clinodactyly
Phalangeal dysplasia

Additional symptoms include hyperuricemia, high erythrocyte  sedimentation rates and hypertension.

Etimology 

This condition was first discovered in 1972 by L G Anderson et al. and J S Buchignani et al. described the case of 5 siblings and their dad, 4 out of the 5 siblings had recurrent mandibular fractures and cranio-facial dysmorphisms, such as prominent earlobes. These 4 siblings also had hyperuricemia and 3 out of those 4 siblings had hypertension. Their father had hyperuricemia and hypertension but was otherwise unaffected. The siblings were the result of consanguineous Irish parents.

References 

Genetic diseases and disorders